William Romaine Newbold (November 20, 1865 – September 8, 1926) was an American philosopher who held the Adam Seybert Professor of Intellectual and Moral Philosophy chair at the University of Pennsylvania from 1907 to 1926. Newbold was noted for his lectures and writings on the psychology of religion, Christian Gnosticism, and cryptography.

William was born in 1865 to William Allibone Newbold and Martha S Bailey. In 1919 he began an analysis of the Voynich Manuscript at the request of Wilfrid Voynich. After his initial study Newbold quickly agreed with Voynich that the manuscript had been authored by the English polymath Roger Bacon. During the next several years, Newbold developed a complex system to decipher it and his analysis, The Cipher of Roger Bacon, was published two years after his death. Newbold's theory was entirely disproved in a 1931 paper by his friend John Matthews Manly and it is now mostly disregarded.

Newbold was interested in parapsychology. In the early 1890s he attended séances with the medium Leonora Piper.

William also had an interest in genealogy. He was a descendant of the Newbold family of Hackenthorpe, now part of the city of Sheffield. He paid a visit to the village shortly before his death, where he visited Hackenthorpe Hall, built by his ancestor John Newbold (d. 1697). His research was used to produce a book.

Publications

Books
The Voynich Roger Bacon Manuscript (1921)
The Cipher of Roger Bacon (1928)

Papers
Newbold, W. R. (1896). Sub-Conscious Reasoning. Proceedings of the Society for Psychical Research 12: 11–20.
Newbold, W. R. (1898). A Further Record of Observations of Certain Phenomena of Trance. Proceedings of the Society for Psychical Research 14: 6-49.

References

1865 births
1926 deaths
American cryptographers
Philosophers from Pennsylvania
American theologians
Parapsychologists
University of Pennsylvania people